City (stylized as CITY) is a Japanese manga series written and illustrated by Keiichi Arawi. It was serialized from September 2016 to February 2021 in Kodansha's Seinen manga magazine Morning. It was published in 13 tankōbon volumes. In North America, the series is licensed by Vertical.

Characters

Mont Blanc Trio

A 20-year old university sophomore at Mont Blanc University. She works as a waitress at the Makabe's Western Bistro.

An 18-year old university freshman at the same university as Nagumo and Wako, who dreams to become a photographer.

Similar to Nagumo, she is a university sophomore at the same university as Nagumo and Niikura. However, she has an airhead personality and likes to stalk Nagumo.

Makabe family

The owner and head chef of their family restaurant that specializes in Western-style cuisine. He is married to his wife, who is an archaeologist, and father to their children, Tatewaku and Matsuri.

The older brother of Matsuri, who is a second-year high school student and a substitute player at his school's soccer team.

The younger sister of Tatewaku, who is a middle school student. She spends her free time with Ecchan, her best friend.

Tsurubishi's mother-in-law and Tatewaku and Matsuri's grandmother. She is the owner of Mokumesei Manor, an apartment complex where the Mont Blanc Trio resides.

Adatara family

The patriarch of the family and he is a retired scientist.

The owner of their liquor store. He and Mrs. Adatara have five children.

Wife of Mr. Adatara and mother to their five children.

The eldest son of the family. He used to be a former soccer player and the current heir to the family-owned liquor store.

The eldest daughter of the family. She served as a manager to Shia Azumaya.

The second son of the family and classmate of Tatewaku and Riko. He is called by the class as the "modern-day William Tell".

The eldest of the twins.

The youngest of the twins.

Publication
The series is written and illustrated by Keiichi Arawi and began serialization in Kodansha's Morning magazine on September 29, 2016. The series concluded on February 4, 2021. Kodansha published the series in 13 volumes. An online autograph contest was held to celebrate the final volume's release.

At Anime Expo 2017, Vertical announced they licensed the series for English publication.

Volume list

Reception
At San Diego Comic-Con 2019, Rob McMonigal picked the series as the best continuing series for grown-ups.

The series has been praised by most critics. Sean Gaffney from A Case Suitable for Treatment gave the series praise, saying it "made him smile". Ian Wolf from Anime UK News stated that he liked the series, stating that fans of Arawi's style in Nichijou will also like this series. Ross Locksley from UK Anime Network felt similarly about the manga, rating it a seven and saying the rating is a nine for fans of Nichijou and a five for anyone else. However, Katherine Dacey from The Manga Critic was more critical, calling the series' jokes "tired slapstick [humor]" and the characters "strenuously unpleasant".

References

External links
  
 

Kodansha manga
Seinen manga
Slice of life anime and manga
Surreal comedy anime and manga
Vertical (publisher) titles